The 19th century in the United States refers to the period in the United States from 1801 through 1900 in the Gregorian calendar.  For information on this period, see:

 History of the United States series:
 History of the United States (1789–1849)
 History of the United States (1849–1865)
 History of the United States (1865–1918)
Historical eras:
Jeffersonian era
Era of Good Feelings
Jacksonian era
American Civil War
Reconstruction era
Gilded Age
Progressive Era